Whitehead's spiny rat (Maxomys whiteheadi) is a species of rodent in the family Muridae.
It is found in Indonesia, Malaysia, and Thailand.

References

External links
Photo at ARKive.

Maxomys
Rodents of Indonesia
Rodents of Malaysia
Rodents of Thailand
Mammals described in 1894
Taxa named by Oldfield Thomas
Taxonomy articles created by Polbot